The Settlers of Zarahemla is a licensed adaptation of the German board game The Settlers of Catan by Klaus Teuber, based on the Book of Mormon.  Gameplay in Zarahemla is nearly identical to the original, with several major differences - most notably, the game has been modified to suit two-player play as part of its official rules.

Equipment 
Like Catan, Zarahemla uses a somewhat modular board structure, but instead of individual hexes (as is the case of Catan), Zarahemla uses five strips of hexes - one five-hex strip, two four-hex strips, and three-hex strips, which could be oriented and rearranged as in the standard game.  Unlike Catan, however, Zarahemla's hexes are placed on a fixed board, which itself contains the game's harbors, or trading posts.  The board also contains a scoring track, which aids in keeping scores for the players.

The game is no longer in production.

Gameplay 

As Zarahemla's gameplay is nearly identical to that of Catan, the rules of Catan should also be consulted for gameplay information.

Preparation in Zarahemla is identical to that of Catan, except that, for the two-player game, three settlements and roads are placed instead of two.

As in the later expansions of Catan, players are permitted to trade and build in any order.  Like The Settlers of Canaan, another licensed adaptation of Catan, and the Cheops expansion to Catan, players may also contribute a stone to the Temple of Zarahemla for the price of one brick and one stone.  The player with the greatest contribution (of at least three stones) to the Temple receives two victory points, which are given out akin to the Largest Army or the Longest Trade Route in Catan.  Each player begins the game with ten Temple Stones.

There are two additional types of Development Cards used in Zarahemla - Temple Building allows two temple stones to be placed for free, while Liahona acts in a manner similar to the Alchemist Progress Card from Cities and Knights of Catan.

Zarahemla is played to twelve Victory Points, unlike ten in Catan.

Zarahemla
Works based on the Book of Mormon
Board games introduced in 2003